51 Pegasi (abbreviated 51 Peg), formally named Helvetios , is a Sun-like star located  from Earth in the constellation of Pegasus. It was the first main-sequence star found to have an exoplanet (designated 51 Pegasi b, officially named Dimidium, formerly unofficially dubbed Bellerophon) orbiting it.

Properties

The star's apparent magnitude is 5.49, making it visible with the naked eye under suitable viewing conditions.

51 Pegasi was listed as a standard star for the spectral type G2IV in the 1989 The Perkins catalog of revised MK types for the cooler stars. Historically, it was generally given a stellar classification of G5V, and even in more modern catalogues it is usually listed as a main-sequence star. It is generally considered to still be generating energy through the thermonuclear fusion of hydrogen at its core, but to be in a more evolved state than the Sun. It is estimated to be 6.1 – 8.1 billion years old, somewhat older than the Sun, with a radius 24% larger and 11% more massive. The star has a higher proportion of elements other than hydrogen/helium compared to the Sun; a quantity astronomers term a star's metallicity. Stars with higher metallicity such as this are more likely to host planets. In 1996, astronomers Baliunas, Sokoloff, and Soon measured a rotational period of 37 days for 51 Pegasi.

Although the star was suspected of being variable during a 1981 study, subsequent observation showed there was almost no chromospheric activity between 1977 and 1989. Further examination between 1994 and 2007 showed a similar low or flat level of activity. This, along with its relatively low X-ray emission, suggests that the star may be in a Maunder minimum period during which a star produces a reduced number of star spots.

The star rotates at an inclination of 79 degrees relative to Earth.

Nomenclature
51 Pegasi is the Flamsteed designation. On its discovery, the star's planet — and actually the first exoplanet discovered around a main-sequence star — was designated 51 Pegasi b by its discoverers and unofficially dubbed Bellerophon, in keeping with the convention of naming planets after Greek and Roman mythological figures (Bellerophon was a figure from Greek mythology who rode the winged horse Pegasus).

In July 2014, the International Astronomical Union launched NameExoWorlds, a process for giving proper names to certain exoplanets and their host stars. The process involved public nomination and voting for the new names. In December 2015, the IAU announced the names of Helvetios for this star and Dimidium for its planet.

The names were those submitted by the Astronomische Gesellschaft Luzern, Switzerland. "Helvetios" is Latin for "the Helvetian" and refers to the Celtic tribe that lived in Switzerland during antiquity; 'Dimidium' is Latin for 'half', referring to the planet's mass of at least half the mass of Jupiter.

In 2016, the IAU organized a Working Group on Star Names (WGSN) to catalog and standardize proper names for stars. In its first bulletin of July 2016, the WGSN explicitly recognized the names of exoplanets and their host stars approved by the Executive Committee Working Group Public Naming of Planets and Planetary Satellites, including the names of stars adopted during the 2015 NameExoWorlds campaign. This star is now so entered in the IAU Catalog of Star Names.

Planetary system

On October 6, 1995, Swiss astronomers Michel Mayor and Didier Queloz announced the discovery of an exoplanet orbiting 51 Pegasi.  The discovery was made at Observatoire de Haute-Provence in France. On 8 October 2019, Mayor and Queloz shared the Nobel Prize in Physics for their discovery.

51 Pegasi b (51 Peg b) was the first discovered planetary-mass companion of a main-sequence parent star. At the time of its discovery, this close distance was not compatible with theories of planet formation and resulted in discussions of planetary migration. However, several hot Jupiters are now known to be oblique relative to the stellar axis.

See also

Star systems
 47 Ursae Majoris
 55 Cancri
 70 Virginis
 PSR B1257+12
 Tau Boötis
 Upsilon Andromedae

Other articles
 Lists of exoplanets
 Solar analog
Portal
 Portal:Astronomy

References

External links

 
 51 Pegasi at SolStation.com.
 nStars database entry
 David Darling's encyclopedia

G-type main-sequence stars
Pegasi, 51
Maunder Minimum
Planetary systems with one confirmed planet

Pegasus (constellation)
BD+19 5036
Pegasi, 51
0882
217014
113357
8729